Jordyn Allen (born 6 July 2000) is an Australian rules footballer playing for the Collingwood Football Club in the AFL Women's competition (AFLW).

State football
Allen played junior football with boys at Rye Demons in the Mornington Peninsula Junior Football League.

In 2016, Allen started playing with Dandenong Stingrays Youth Girls Academy. She also played as vice-captain for Vic Metro and helped them win the 2016 AFL Youth Girls National Championships as the team beat Western Australia by 95 points at the MCG under the coaching of Wayne Siekman. She was named Vic Metro's Most Valuable Player for her defensive efforts and leadership.

Allen was selected for the 2017 AFL Women's Under 18 All-Australian team.

Allen started the 2018 season as a top AFLW draft prospect. For a second consecutive season, she played for and captained Dandenong Stingrays in the TAC Cup. At the end of the season, she won the club's best and fairest award and was selected for the 2018 TAC Cup Team of the Year. In July, Allen captained Vic Country in the 2018 AFL Women's Under 18 Championships. At the end of the series, she was selected for the season's All-Australian team. Allen also played five games in 2018 for Casey Demons in the VFL Women's (VFLW), twice being named in the club's best players. Despite all the accolades, Allen thought she plateaued in 2018 as she felt she had to take a step back to focus on playing with passion and enjoyment.

AFL Women's career
Allen was drafted by Collingwood with the club's first selection and the fifth pick overall in the 2018 AFL Women's draft. She made her debut in the club's loss against Geelong at GMHBA Stadium in the opening round of the 2019 season. In her debut season, Allen played as a defender. For the 2019 season she moved forward into the midfield and scored her first professional goal against Carlton in round 5. Allen was awarded a Rising Star nomination following her performance in Collingwood's six-point victory over Brisbane at Victoria Park in round 7, their only win of the season. In the match she collected 10 disposals, took six marks, and laid three tackles. Following the season in which she played all seven matches, in April 2019, she signed a new deal with Collingwood ahead of the 2020 season. Following AFL Women's season seven, Allen won Collingwood's AFLW best and fairest award.

Personal life
Allen grew up in Rye on the Mornington Peninsula. In her junior years, she was a motocross rider for seven years, but after countless injuries and hospital stays as well as due to the financial burden, she focused on playing Australian rules football from the age of 12. She finished her VCE exams the day before her first professional pre-season campaign.

Statistics
Statistics are correct the end of the S7 (2022) season.

|- 
! scope="row" style="text-align:center" | 2019
|style="text-align:center;"|
| 6 || 7 || 1 || 2 || 43 || 18 || 61 || 22 || 9 || 0.1 || 0.3 || 6.1 || 2.6 || 8.7 || 3.1 || 1.3
|-
! scope="row" style="text-align:center" | 2020
|style="text-align:center;"|
| 6 || 7 || 1 || 2 || 34 || 25 || 59 || 20 || 3 || 0.1 || 0.3 || 4.9 || 3.6 || 8.4 || 2.9 || 0.4
|- 
! scope="row" style="text-align:center" | 2021
|style="text-align:center;"|
| 6 || 6 || 0 || 0 || 31 || 23 || 54 || 15 || 10 || 0.0 || 0.0 || 5.2 || 3.8 || 9.0 || 2.5 || 1.7
|- 
! scope="row" style="text-align:center" | 2022
|style="text-align:center;"|
| 6 || 10 || 1 || 0 || 66 || 48 || 114 || 38 || 13 || 0.1 || 0.0 || 6.6 || 4.8 || 11.4 || 3.8 || 1.3
|- 
! scope="row" style="text-align:center" | S7 (2022)
|style="text-align:center;"|
| 6 || 12 || 2 || 0 || 114 || 56 || 170 || 46 || 24 || 0.2 || 0.0 || 9.5 || 4.7 || 14.2 || 3.8 || 2.0
|- class="sortbottom"
! colspan=3| Career
! 42
! 5
! 4
! 288
! 170
! 458
! 141
! 59
! 0.1
! 0.1
! 6.9
! 4.0
! 10.9
! 3.4
! 1.4
|}

References

External links 

2000 births
Living people
Dandenong Stingrays players (NAB League Girls)
Collingwood Football Club (AFLW) players
Australian rules footballers from Victoria (Australia)
Sportswomen from Victoria (Australia)
21st-century Australian women